Up Here is an upcoming musical romantic comedy television series developed by Steven Levenson, Kristen Anderson-Lopez, Robert Lopez, and Danielle Sanchez-Witzel for Hulu.

Cast and characters

Main 

 Mae Whitman as Lindsay
 Carlos Valdes as Miguel
 Katie Finneran as Joan
 John Hodgman as Tom
 Andréa Burns as Rosie
 Sophia Hammons as Celeste
 Emilia Suárez as Renee

Recurring 

 George Hampe as Ned
 Julia McDermott as Fiona
 Scott Porter as Orson
 Ayumi Patterson as Marta
 Brian Stokes Mitchell as Ted/Mr. McGooch

Episodes

Production

Development 
The series was first announced in January 2022 when Hulu gave the project a series order. Steven Levenson, Kristen Anderson-Lopez, Robert Lopez, and Danielle Sanchez-Witzel were set as writers and executive producers.

Casting 
Mae Whitman was cast in March 2022, and Carlos Valdes was cast in June. Later that month, Katie Finneran, John Hodgman, Andréa Burns, Sophia Hammons, and Emilia Suárez were cast as series regulars, along with George Hampe, Julia McDermott, Scott Porter, Ayumi Patterson, and Brian Stokes Mitchell in recurring roles.

Release 
All eight episodes are scheduled to be released on Hulu in the united states, Disney+ vía Star internationally and Star+ in the Latin America  on March 24, 2023.

References

External links 

2020s American musical comedy television series
2020s American romantic comedy television series
Hulu original programming
Television series by 20th Century Fox Television
Upcoming comedy television series